Joseph Charles Glenn (November 19, 1908 – May 6, 1985) was a backup catcher in Major League Baseball who played for the New York Yankees (1932–33, 1935–38), St. Louis Browns (1939) and Boston Red Sox (1940). Glenn batted and threw right-handed. He was born in Dickson City, Pennsylvania.

Glenn caught Babe Ruth during his last pitching game, and also caught Ted Williams in Williams' only pitching appearance: it was at Fenway Park on August 24, 1940. In an eight-season career, Glenn posted a .252 batting average with five home runs and 89 RBI in 248 games played.

Glenn died in Tunkhannock, Pennsylvania, at age of 76.

References

External links

1908 births
1985 deaths
People from Dickson City, Pennsylvania
New York Yankees players
St. Louis Browns players
Boston Red Sox players
Major League Baseball catchers
Minor league baseball managers
Baseball players from Pennsylvania
Carbondale Pioneers players
Moline A's players
Kewanee A's players
Stamford Pioneers players